Ophelia Alcantara Dimalanta (June 16, 1932 – November 4, 2010) was a Filipina poet, editor, author, and teacher. One of the country's most respected writers, Dimalanta published several books of poetry, criticism, drama, and prose and edited various literary anthologies. In 1999, she received Southeast Asia's highest literary honor, the S.E.A. Write Award.

Early years 

Born in San Juan City in the Philippines, Dimalanta took up her bachelor's degree, Master's Degree, and Doctor of Philosophy at the University of Santo Tomas (UST). Trained as a concert pianist, Dimalanta focused on poetry, publishing her first collection of poems, Montage in 1974.

Career 

Dimalanta served as the Writer in Residence and a Full Professor of Literature and Creative Writing at the UST Graduate School and at the Faculty of Arts and Letters until her untimely passing. During her academic career, she held various administrative posts, including the position of Dean of the Faculty of Arts and Letters and Director of the Center for Creative Writing and Studies.

A panelist for various writing workshops at UST, University of the Philippines, Silliman University in Dumaguete,  and Mindanao State University-Iligan Institute of Technology in Iligan, Dimalanta served as a judge in prominent literary award-giving bodies such as the National Book Awards by the Manila Critics' Circle, Philippines Free Press Literary Awards, and Don Carlos Palanca Memorial Awards for Literature. This status, alongside her teaching experience, enabled her to reach and influence generations of journalists and creative writers like Recah Trinidad, Arnold Azurin, Cirilo Bautista, Albert B. Casuga, Cristina Pantoja-Hidalgo, Eric Gamalinda, Jose Neil Garcia, Mike Coroza, and Lourd de Veyra.

Dimalanta published several books in her lifetime: seven books on poetry, one on drama, one on criticism, and one on her collected prose. Her first collection of poems, Montage, won the Iowa State University Best Poetry Award (1969), and first prize (poetry category) in the Palanca Memorial Awards for Literature (1974).

She was a founding member and served as chairman of the Manila Critics Circle and an honorary fellow of the Philippine Literary Arts Council. Poet and critic Cirilo F. Bautista hailed her as "not only our foremost woman poet but also one of the best poets writing now, regardless of gender."

Dimalanta also wrote critical reviews in international journals and local periodicals and taught at Colegio de San Juan de Letran and De La Salle University. The Ateneo de Manila University honored Dimalanta with the 13th Paz Marquez-Benitez Memorial Lecture and Exhibit which was organized by the Ateneo Library of Women’s Writings (Aliww).

In 2002, UST published Dimalanta's verse drama, "Lorenzo Ruiz, Escribano: A Play in Two Acts," with a Filipino translation by Florentino H. Hornedo and Michael M. Coroza. It was premiered on 22–24 February 1994 at UST in a production directed by Isagani R. Cruz.

Aside from her career in Literature, Dimalanta is also known to have founded in 1995 the UST Faculty of Arts and Letters' official choir, the UST Chorus of Arts and Letters, (or the AB Chorale) with Mr. Paulo Zarate as its first musical director. She also penned the lyrics of the Hymn of the said Faculty.

Dimalanta lived with her family until her death in Navotas.

Bibliography 

Poetry
Finder Loser
Montage (1974)
Time Factor (1983)
Flowing On (1988)
Lady Polyester (1993)
Love Woman (1998)
Passional (2002)
The Ophelia Alcantara Dimalanta Reader, Volume 1, Poetry (2005)

Criticism
The Philippine Poetic

Anthology
Anthology of Philippine Contemporary Literature
Readings from Contemporary English

Prose
The Ophelia Alcantara Dimalanta Reader, Volume 2, Prose (2006)

Drama
Lorenzo Ruiz, Escribano: A Play in Two Acts (2002)

Honors 

Poet and Critic Best Poem Award from Iowa State University (1968)
Palanca Awards for Poetry (1974, 1983)
Fernando Maria Guerrero Award (1976)
Focus Literary Award for Fiction (1977, 1981)
Cultural Center of the Philippines Literature Grant for Criticism (1983)
Gawad Pambansang Alagad ni Balagtas from the Writers' Union of the Philippines (1990)
Southeast Asia (SEA) Write Award from King Bhumibol of Thailand (1999)
Parangal Hagbong, University of Santo Tomas (2008)

References

External links 
 A profile of Ophelia Dimalanta in the Philippine literary portal, Panitikan.com.ph
 Homage to Ophelia Dimalanta by UST Rector Rev. Fr. Rolando dela Rosa
 Announcement of writers' tribute for Dimalanta
 We Love Ophelia Dimalanta Facebook Page
 A review of Ophelia Dimalanta on La Naval
 A review of Ophelia Dimalanta on At Large, At Leisure by Nestor Cuartero
 A review of An Angelic Mind in a Human Face: St. Thomas, His Life in Visuals, a coffee-table book of Fr. José Antonio Aureada
 A review of Believe and Betray: New and Collected Poems by Cirilo Bautista

1932 births
2010 deaths
20th-century Filipino poets
20th-century Filipino women writers
21st-century Filipino poets
21st-century Filipino women writers
Filipino women poets
Filipino literary critics
Writers from Metro Manila
People from San Juan, Metro Manila
University of Santo Tomas alumni